Derek Culver (born May 24, 1998) is an American professional basketball player who last played for the Lakeland Magic of the NBA G League. He played college basketball for the West Virginia Mountaineers.

Early life and high school career
Culver grew up in Youngstown, Ohio, which he called "a violent place, there’s really not a lot going on there." He attended Warren G. Harding High School in Warren, Ohio and was coached by Andy Vlajkovich. As a junior, he averaged 16 points and 10 rebounds per game, leading his team to a Division I district title and the regional semifinals. Culver was dismissed from the team midway through his senior season for undisclosed reasons. He played a postgraduate year at Brewster Academy in Wolfeboro, New Hampshire. Culver averaged 14 points and 10 rebounds per game and earned First Team New England Preparatory School Athletic Council (NEPSAC) Class AAA selection. He led his team to the NEPSAC Class AAA regular season title. A consensus four-star recruit, he committed to play college basketball for West Virginia over offers from Arizona, Kansas and Indiana, among others.

College career
Before playing for West Virginia, Culver was suspended indefinitely for violating team rules. He was reinstated after about one month. On February 4, 2019, Culver recorded a freshman season-high 23 points and 12 rebounds in an 81–50 loss to Texas Tech. On February 26, he posted 22 points and 21 rebounds in a 104–96 triple overtime win over TCU. He became the first West Virginia player to record at least 20 points and 20 rebounds in a game since Mo Robinson in 1977. As a freshman, Culver averaged 11.5 points and a team-high 9.9 rebounds, leading the Big 12 in rebounding during conference play. He was named to the Second Team All-Big 12 and was a unanimous Big 12 All-Freshman Team selection.

Entering his sophomore season, Culver was among 20 players named to the Kareem Abdul-Jabbar Award watch list. On December 1, 2019, he tallied a career-high 25 points and 11 rebounds off the bench in an 86–81 victory over Rhode Island. Culver was often tasked with defending smaller players and was sometimes benched in favor of a smaller lineup. As a sophomore, he averaged 10.4 points and 8.6 rebounds per game and was named to the All-Big 12 Honorable Mention.

Culver began his junior season by leading the Mountaineers to the Crossover Classic Championship. Culver averaged 15 points and 10 rebounds per game and was named MVP of the tournament. He finished his college career with 1,036 points and 799 rebounds.

On April 26, 2021, Athletes Sports Management announced that it had signed Culver, and the agency's president also said that he would not be returning to West Virginia for another season. Culver denied this on Instagram, and a spokesperson for the school said that he has not told the Mountaineers he was leaving. Later that day, Culver clarified all of the confusion and officially announced that he would forego his senior year and explore professional options. Culver went undrafted in the 2021 NBA Draft.

Professional career

Fort Wayne Mad Ants (2021)
On October 15, 2021, Culver signed with the Indiana Pacers, but was waived the following day. He joined the Fort Wayne Mad Ants as an affiliate player. On November 2, Culver was waived before the season opener.

Wisconsin Herd (2021–2022)
On December 18, 2021, Culver was acquired by the Wisconsin Herd of the NBA G League. He was later waived on January 5, 2022.

Delaware Blue Coats (2022)
On November 4, 2022, Culver was named to the opening night roster for the Delaware Blue Coats. However, he was waived on December 3.

Capitanes de Ciudad de México (2023)
On January 4, 2023, Culver was acquired by the Capitanes de Ciudad de México. On February 14, 2023, Culver was waived.

South Bay Lakers (2023)
On February 18, 2023, Culver was acquired by the South Bay Lakers. He was waived five days later.

Lakeland Magic (2023)
On February 25, 2023, Culver was acquired by the Lakeland Magic. Two days later, he was waived, after appearing in one game.

Career statistics

College

|-
| style="text-align:left;"| 2018–19
| style="text-align:left;"| West Virginia
| 26 || 14 || 27.0 || .456 || .000 || .585 || 9.9 || 1.7 || .5 || .7 || 11.5
|-
| style="text-align:left;"| 2019–20
| style="text-align:left;"| West Virginia
| 31 || 25 || 24.5 || .457 || .000 || .517 || 8.6 || 1.7 || .8 || .8 || 10.4
|-
| style="text-align:left;"| 2020–21
| style="text-align:left;"| West Virginia
| 29 || 28 || 26.3 || .478 || — || .624 || 9.4 || 1.1 || .8 || .8 || 14.3
|- class="sortbottom"
| style="text-align:center;" colspan="2"| Career
|| 86 || 67 || 25.9 || .465 || .000 || .576 || 9.3 || 1.5 || .7 || .8 || 12.0

Personal life
Culver's cousin Lynn Bowden played quarterback and wide receiver at Kentucky and was drafted by the Las Vegas Raiders and then traded to the Miami Dolphins where he has been used primarily as a wide receiver along with the ability to be used as a "utility player" as well.

References

External links
West Virginia Mountaineers bio

1998 births
Living people
21st-century African-American sportspeople
African-American basketball players
American expatriate basketball people in Mexico
American men's basketball players
Basketball players from Youngstown, Ohio
Brewster Academy alumni
Capitanes de Ciudad de México players
Centers (basketball)
Delaware Blue Coats players
Fort Wayne Mad Ants players
Lakeland Magic players
West Virginia Mountaineers men's basketball players
Wisconsin Herd players